Verkhnetavlykayevo (Ürge Tawlıqay) is a rural locality (a selo) and the administrative centre of Tavlykayevsky Selsoviet, Baymaksky District, Bashkortostan, Russia. The population was 616 as of 2010. There are 9 streets.

Geography 
Verkhnetavlykayevo is located 23 km northwest of Baymak (the district's administrative centre) by road. Nizhnetavlykayevo is the nearest rural locality.

References 

Rural localities in Baymaksky District